The Toyota RV8 engine family is a series of race car engines designed, developed and produced by Toyota Racing Development. They come in 2.65-liter, 3.0-liter and 3.4-liter, turbocharged and naturally-aspirated, V8 racing engine versions. They are used in the CART series, IRL IndyCar Series, Formula Nippon, Super GT, and Le Mans Prototype sports car racing, from 1996 to 2015. The naturally-aspirated engine, formerly used in Formula Nippon and Super GT, is itself derived from the Toyota Indy V8 Indy car racing V8 engine.

TS030 Hybrid engine 
The TS030 uses a naturally aspirated gasoline  V8 power unit, mounted at a 90-degree cylinder bank angle, and produces . Toyota engineers elected to base the engine on their Super GT project instead of constructing a new one. The six-speed sequential gearbox unit was transverse-mounted to the engine and the brakes were constructed from carbon materials.

The TS030 Hybrid featured a Kinetic energy recovery system (KERS) regenerative braking device produced by Toyota Racing Development (the Le Mans organisers, Automobile Club de l'Ouest (ACO), use the alternate name ERS) to charge a super capacitor. Its motor generator unit acts as a generator under braking; this allows it to harvest direct energy from the drive shaft which slows the car and converts energy into electricity that is stored in the super capacitor, which was supplied by Nisshinbo and mounted in the car's passenger compartment. The result allows for faster lap times when the driver exits track turns and saves fuel by reducing engine usage leaving a corner. Toyota chose Aisin AW to build the front electric motor while Denso were selected to build the rear power unit.

TS040 Hybrid engine 

The TS040 Hybrid also uses mid-mounted, naturally-aspirated petrol V8 engine, angled at 90 degrees, was carried over from the TS030 Hybrid. The engine was developed to run with a fuel flow metre promoting a concept switch to efficiency from power. The bosses-mounted injection system  were in the inlet tract and placed over the angled throttle valves relative to the inlet path. They were fitted with eight solenoid injectors which sent power each of the throttle runners and into the inlet portlets. Toyota installed two systems featuring knock control to detect vibration and real-time combustion pressure sensors to tune the spark timing among other engine components during a race for reliability purposes.

Applications

Formula Nippon/Super Formula
Lola B06/51
Swift 017.n

LMP1
Lola B10/60
Toyota TS030 Hybrid
Toyota TS040 Hybrid

Super GT (GT300)
Toyota Prius apr GT

CART/IndyCar series
Reynard 96I
Reynard 97I
Reynard 98I
Eagle MK-V
Eagle 987
Eagle 997
Reynard 02I
Lola B02/00
Swift 010.c

References

External links

Toyota engines
Toyota in motorsport
IndyCar Series
Champ Car
Super Formula
V8 engines
Gasoline engines by model
Engines by model